Steven Lowell Hargan (born September 8, 1942), is a former professional baseball player who pitched in Major League Baseball from 1965 to 1972 and 1974 to 1977.

The son of Lowell and Florence Hargan, he grew up in Fort Wayne, Indiana and excelled in basketball and football at South Side High School, from which he graduated in 1961. However, the school did not have an organized baseball team; he played on Pony League, Junior Federation and Connie Mack League teams and by the spring of 1961 he was being scouted by five Major League teams. He signed with the Cleveland Indians, who offered him a contract after he pitched with other prospects in a tryout at Cleveland Municipal Stadium.

On August 2, 1965, Hargan made his first major-league start, at home against the Detroit Tigers. He said his debut "was quite exciting. I remember I started against Mickey Lolich and he was already an established pitcher. I was trying too hard and throwing as hard as I could." He cruised through the first three innings and led 4–0, but then he gave up two runs in the fourth inning, and was lifted after giving up three runs in the fifth without retiring a batter. He received a no-decision as the Indians lost 12–7. In front of friends and family, he recorded his first major-league win, against the California Angels on August 25 at Dodger Stadium, in the Angels' last season there.

In 1967, he pitched shutouts in his first two starts in April. By midseason his 9–7 record with a 2.68 ERA and 10 complete games in 17 starts earned him a berth on his first and only Major League Baseball All-Star Game. He pulled a hamstring in his last start before the 1967 All-Star Game and did not pitch in the game. That year he led the American League in shutouts with six. 

Injuries hampered him throughout his career, including arm problems, an ankle fracture and later carpal tunnel syndrome. He pitched for the Indians from 1965 through 1972, the Texas Rangers from 1974–77, and the Toronto Blue Jays and Atlanta Braves in 1977.

References

External links
 or Retrosheet
Venezuelan Professional Baseball League

1942 births
Living people
American expatriate baseball players in Canada
American League All-Stars
Atlanta Braves players
Baseball players from Fort Wayne, Indiana
Burlington Indians players (1958–1964)
Charleston Indians players
Cleveland Indians players
Columbus Clippers players
Dubuque Packers players
Industriales de Valencia players
Leones del Caracas players
American expatriate baseball players in Venezuela
Major League Baseball pitchers
Oklahoma City 89ers players
Portland Beavers players
Selma Cloverleafs players
Texas Rangers players
Toledo Mud Hens players
Toronto Blue Jays players
Wichita Aeros players